= City Estate of the 18th and 19th centuries, Starokirochny Lane =

Historical building in Moscow, Russia

City Estate of the XVIII-XIX centuries
- Городская усадьба XVIII—XIX веков
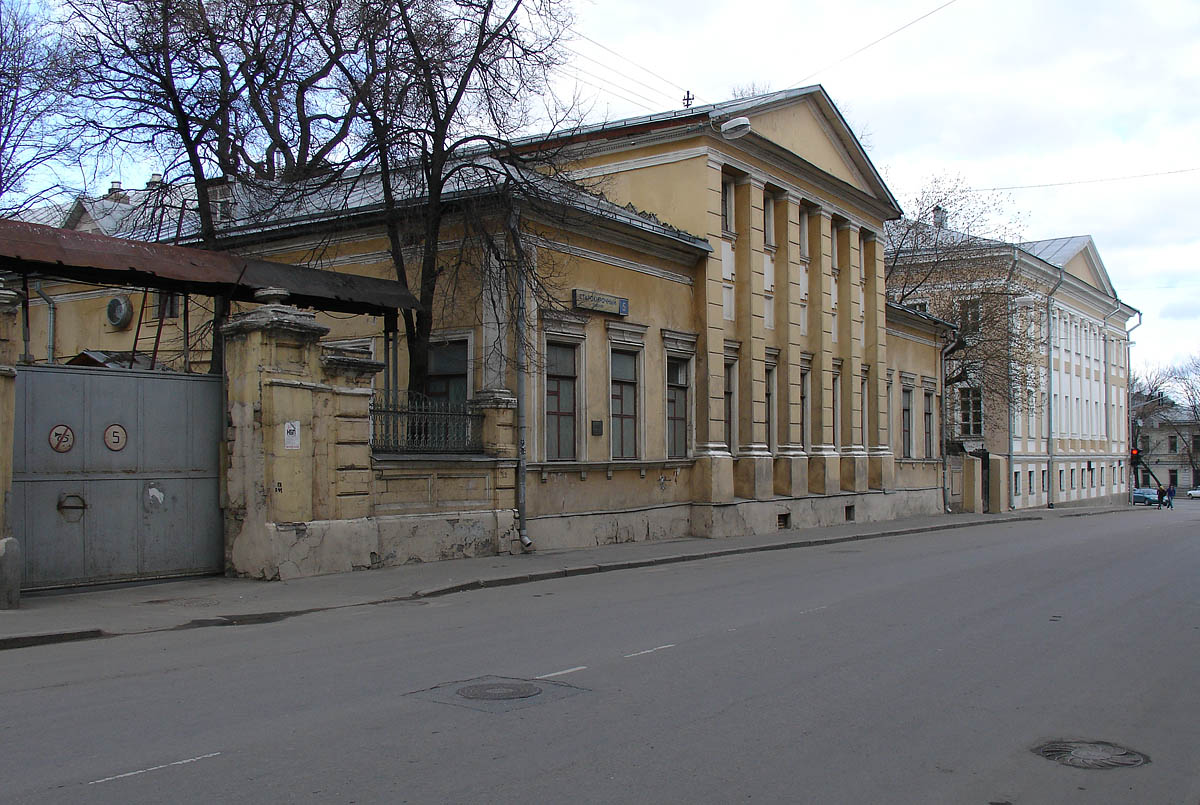
- Interactive map of City Estate of the XVIII-XIX centuries
- Location: Moscow, 5 Starokirochnom Lane., Building 1–5
- Coordinates: 55°46′09″N 37°41′02″E

The City Estate of the 18th and 19th Centuries (Russian: Городская усадьба XVIII—XIX веков) is a historical building in Moscow. The farmstead is located in Starokirochny Lane (house 5, buildings 1 and 5) in the territory of the former German settlement. The ensemble of the city manor is an object of cultural heritage of regional importance.

== History and description ==
The main house of the city manor in Starokirochny Lane (house 5, building 1) was built at the turn of the 18th–19th centuries. Manor ensemble continued to form during the 19th century. In 1819, two separate plots were united, after which the property received borders close to modern ones. In 1896 architect NI Yakunin built a lodge (house 5, building 5) for the estate and a fence with a gate.

By the beginning of the 20th century, the estate belonged to the hereditary honorable citizens of Borodin. Then in the production and storage buildings was the workshop of musical instruments of the brothers Goh. In 1911 the warehouse building was built on. In 1912, the estate housed the Lefortovo City Primary School.

The main house of the manor is built in the style of classicism. The central part of the front facade is decorated with pilasters triangular pediment. The windows are decorated with platbands in a rectangular shape. Well-preserved layout and interiors: stucco ceilings, stucco moldings of ceremonial halls, framing of doorways, panel doors and furnaces of the 19th century. The farmstead played an important role in shaping the appearance of Starokirochny Lane.
